Caitlin Parker (born 17 April 1996) is an Australian amateur boxer who won a silver medal at the 2018 Commonwealth Games. She also won bronze at the 2014 Youth Olympics and competed at the 2020 Summer Olympics.

Early life 
Parker was born on 17 April 1996 in Perth, Australia. She began training in taekwondo and boxing at the age of 11 after her father refused to let her walk to school alone without learning self defence.

References

External links

1996 births
Living people
Australian women boxers
Middleweight boxers
Sportspeople from Perth, Western Australia
Boxers at the 2018 Commonwealth Games
Boxers at the 2022 Commonwealth Games
Commonwealth Games silver medallists for Australia
Commonwealth Games bronze medallists for Australia
Commonwealth Games medallists in boxing
Boxers at the 2014 Summer Youth Olympics
Boxers at the 2020 Summer Olympics
Olympic boxers of Australia
20th-century Australian women
21st-century Australian women
Medallists at the 2018 Commonwealth Games
Medallists at the 2022 Commonwealth Games